Eugene H. Thompson (May 24, 1930 – October 17, 1999) was an American politician who served in the New Jersey General Assembly from the 29th Legislative District from 1978 to 1988.

References

1930 births
1999 deaths
Democratic Party members of the New Jersey General Assembly
Politicians from Newark, New Jersey
20th-century American politicians